Fundura is a village in the northwestern part of the island of Santiago, Cape Verde. It is part of the municipality of Santa Catarina. In 2010 its population was 1,070. It is located about 8 km north of Assomada, on the road to Tarrafal (EN1-ST01).

References

Villages and settlements in Santiago, Cape Verde
Santa Catarina, Cape Verde